Apoptosis-stimulating of p53 protein 1 is a protein that in humans is encoded by the PPP1R13B gene.

This gene encodes a member of the ASPP (apoptosis-stimulating protein of p53) family of p53 interacting proteins. The protein contains four ankyrin repeats and an SH3 domain involved in protein-protein interactions. ASPP proteins are required for the induction of apoptosis by p53-family proteins. They promote DNA binding and transactivation of p53-family proteins on the promoters of proapoptotic genes. Expression of this gene is regulated by the E2F transcription factor.

References

Further reading